Betts Academy was a well-known private academy in Stamford, Connecticut that operated from 1838 to 1908.

History
The school was founded in 1838 in North Stamford by James Betts, a Congregational Church deacon originally from Wilton, Connecticut. Later his son, William J. Betts, became principal of the school, and the Academy was relocated to Strawberry Hill overlooking Long Island Sound in Stamford. The school burned in a fire in 1908 and was closed that year.

Notable alumni
Henry Osborne Havemeyer, businessman
Theodore Havemeyer, businessman, co-founder of United States Golf Association and U.S. Open
Eugene O'Neill, Playwright

References

Private schools in Connecticut
Defunct schools in Connecticut